Unityville is an unincorporated community in McCook County, South Dakota, United States.

Unityville was originally called Stark, and under the latter name was laid out in 1907 by J. F. Stark, and named for him.

References

Unincorporated communities in McCook County, South Dakota
Unincorporated communities in South Dakota